Leontopolis may refer to:
 Leontopolis, capital of the 11th nome of Lower Egypt
 Leontopolis (Heliopolis), a city of the 13th nome of Lower Egypt

Leontopolis may also refer to:
 Bizana, Turkey, in eastern Anatolia
 Isaura Nova, in Isauria, Turkey
 Nicephorium, in Syria
 Zaliches, near Sinop